The 2013 Northern European Gymnastics Championships was an artistic gymnastics competition held in Lisburn, Northern Ireland. The event was held between 23 and 24 November at the Lagan Valley LeisurePlex.

Medal table

References

2013
2013 in gymnastics